A by-election was held for the New South Wales Legislative Assembly electorate of Gloucester on 25 August 1934 because of the death of Walter Bennett,.

Walter Bennett's son Charles was selected as the  candidate.

Dates

Result

Preferences were not distributed.The by-election was triggered by the death of Walter Bennett,.

See also
Electoral results for the district of Gloucester
List of New South Wales state by-elections

References

New South Wales state by-elections
1934 elections in Australia
1930s in New South Wales